Larry McCormick may refer to:

 Larry McCormick (TV) (1933–2004), actor and news anchor/reporter
 Larry McCormick (Canadian politician) (1940–2011)
 Lawrence McCormick (1890–1961), Canadian-American ice hockey player